Masticophis is a genus of colubrid snakes, commonly referred to as whip snakes or coachwhips, which are endemic to the Americas. They are characterized by having a long, thin body and are not dangerous to humans.

Distribution and habitat
Species of Masticophis are found in the United States, Mexico, Central America, and northern South America.

Description
Adults of species in the genus Masticophis may attain a total length (including tail) from 152 cm (5 ft) for M. lateralis to 259 cm (8.5 ft) for M. flagellum. A distinctive character of this genus is the shape of the frontal scale (the large scale in the center of the upper surface of the head) which is bell-shaped and elongated. At the rear of the body, the dorsal scales are arranged in only 13 rows.

Species and subspecies
The genus Masticophis contains eleven species that are recognized as being valid, five of which have recognized subspecies.
Masticophis anthonyi  – Clarion Island whip snake
Masticophis aurigulus  – Baja California striped whip snake
Masticophis barbouri  – Baja California striped whip snake, Espiritu Santo striped whip snake
Masticophis bilineatus  – Sonoran whip snake
Masticophis flagellum  – coachwhip
Masticophis flagellum cingulum  – Sonoran coachwhip
Masticophis flagellum flagellum  – eastern coachwhip
Masticophis flagellum lineatulus  – lined coachwhip
Masticophis flagellum piceus  – red coachwhip
Masticophis flagellum ruddocki  – San Joaquin coachwhip
Masticophis flagellum testaceus  – western coachwhip
Masticophis fuliginosus  – Baja California coachwhip
Masticophis lateralis  – California whipsnake
Masticophis lateralis euryxanthus  – Alameda striped racer
Masticophis lateralis lateralis  – California striped racer

Masticophis mentovarius  – neotropical whip snake
Masticophis mentovarius centralis 
Masticophis mentovarius mentovarius 
Masticophis mentovarius suborbitalis 
Masticophis mentovarius striolatus 
Masticophis mentovarius variolosus 
Masticophis schotti  – Schott's whip snake
Masticophis schotti ruthveni  – Ruthven's whip snake
Masticophis schotti schotti  – Schott's whip snake
Masticophis slevini  – Isla San Esteban whipsnake, San Esteban Island whipsnake 
Masticophis taeniatus  – striped whip snake
Masticophis taeniatus girardi  – Central Texas whip snake
Masticophis taeniatus taeniatus  – desert striped whip snake

Nota bene: A binomial authority or trinomial authority in parentheses indicates that the species or subspecies was originally described in a genus other than Masticophis.

References

Further reading
Baird SF, Girard C (1853). Catalogue of North American Reptiles in the Museum of the Smithsonian Institution. Part I.—Serpents. Washington, District of Columbia: Smithsonian Institution. xvi + 172 pp. (Masticophis, new genus, p. 98).

External links
https://serpientesdevenezuela.org/masticophis-mentovarius/

Colubrids
Snake genera
Taxa named by Spencer Fullerton Baird
Taxa named by Charles Frédéric Girard